Harkanovci  is a village in Croatia. It is connected by the D517 highway. Until the end of the World War II, the majority of the inhabitants were Danube Swabians, some of them came around 1865 - 1880 from Tolna County (former)-Hungary, who named the village once Kawinz. Mostly of the former German Settlers was expelled to Allied-occupied Germany and Allied-occupied Austria in 1946-1948, about the Potsdam Agreement. Some of them went then to USA, Canada and Australia in the 1950's. Today few Germans of Croatia live there.

References

Populated places in Osijek-Baranja County